Walker's Shortbread is a Scottish manufacturer of shortbread, biscuits, cookies and crackers. The company's well-known shortbread is baked in the Moray village of Aberlour, following a recipe developed by Joseph Walker in 1898. Walkers Shortbread operates four factories in Aberlour, where the company is also headquartered, and two in nearby Elgin, Scotland.

The company is Scotland's biggest exporter of food and employs over 4,000 people in 15 locations. It is sold in tartan packaging all over the world.

History
The business was founded by Joseph Walker in the village of Aberlour, Speyside, in 1898.

In 1992, Walkers Shortbread started producing oaten biscuits for Duchy Originals, having been approached the previous year.

In 2006, Walkers announced that the bakery in Aberlour would be closing and turning into a research facility for the company.

The company has received the Queen's Award for Export Achievement three times. Walkers Shortbread is also still owned and managed by the Walker family.

In 2017 Walkers Shortbread was granted a Royal Warrant of Appointment from Her Majesty The Queen for the supply of Shortbread to the Royal Household. 

In 2018 the company's profits were diminished by a global increase in the price of butter by around 50% due to global supply shortages and demand increases, resulting in the company seeing a 60% drop in operating profit.

In 2020, the company rebranded, changing their name to Walker's Shortbread Ltd.

Locations
Walker's Shortbread have their headquarters at Aberlour House in Aberlour and have a production site in Elgin.

See also
List of shortbread biscuits and cookies
Scottish cuisine

References

External links
Official site

Scottish brands
Food manufacturers of Scotland
Food and drink companies of Scotland
Bakeries of the United Kingdom
Food and drink companies established in 1898
1898 establishments in Scotland
Companies based in Moray
Shortbread